Dinetus may refer to:
 Dinetus (wasp), a wasp genus in the family Crabronidae
 Dinetus (plant), a plant genus in the family Convolvulaceae